Ku Klux Klan activities in Inglewood, California, were highlighted by the 1922 arrest and trial of 36 men, most of them masked, for a night-time raid on a suspected bootlegger and his family. The raid led to the shooting death of one of the culprits, an Inglewood police officer.  A jury returned a "not guilty" verdict for all defendants who completed the trial. It was this scandal, according to the Los Angeles Times, that eventually led to the outlawing of the Klan in California. The Klan had a chapter in Inglewood as late as October 1931.

People involved

Principals

 Fidel and Angela Elduayen, identified contemporaneously as Spanish, although a 1999 report said that they were Basques, and their children, Bernarda, 13, and Mary, 15. They lived on Pine Avenue, Inglewood, with Mathias Elduayen, Fidel's brother.
 Medford B. Mosher, Inglewood city constable, killed by a gunshot.
 Frank Woerner, Inglewood city marshal (also identified as a "traffic cop") the man who killed Mosher and wounded two others.
 Leonard Ruegg, wounded by Woerner.
 Walter Mosher, son of Medford B., also wounded.
 Clyde Vannatta, a 19-year-old volunteer who drove Woerner to the scene of the shooting on the back of his motorcycle.
 Nicholas Neal, a 17-year-old volunteer who drove Woernor to the scene of the hanging and also supplied the rope.

Defendants

 Nathan A. Baker, Kleagle of the KKK, who collapsed and never completed trial.

 H.B. Beaver, undertaker, whose chapel was used the night before as a place to plan the raid, where the coroner's inquest was held, and the site of last rites for Medford Mosher.
 William S. Coburn, formerly Grand Goblin of the Klan on the Pacific Coast, who returned from Georgia to face trial.
 Walter E. Mosher, son of M.B. Mosher.
 Gus W. Price, King Kleagle of the KKK in California.
 W.A. Alexander, contractor of Huntington Park; R.D. Aylsworth, engineer of Inglewood; C.J. Brown, real estate man of Venice; L.L. Bryson, druggist of Huntington Park;  J.G. Baum, real estate man of Inglewood; Charles Casto, amusement man of Venice; Nathan H. Cherry, surveyor of Inglewood; M.D. Hurlburt, dry cleaner of Bell; William Hall, transfer man of Inglewood; Warren Hall, hauling contractor of Inglewood; J.R. Hamilton, machinist of Huntington Park; Thomas H. Jennings, auto salesman of Inglewood; Frank C. Lemon, cafe man of Bell; Gustav Leonhardt, painting contractor of Venice; Harvey C. Leavitt, motion picture man of Los Angeles; Roy Mears, amusements of Venice; H.A. McCallister, real estate man, Inglewood; William Mitchell or Michel, repair man of Redondo; W.B. Moll, motion pictures of Los Angeles; Leonard Ruegg of Inglewood; E.J. Robichaux, real estate man of Inglewood; Joseph P. Reed, cafe man of Huntington Park; E.E. ReId, repair man of Redondo;  W.D. Record, engineer of Inglewood; Earnest M. Schultz of Santa Monica; Thomas E. Truelove, poultryman of Inglewood; Walter Harrison Ulm, motorman of Inglewood; H.A. Waite, garage man of Inglewood; E.M. or F.M. Walton, patrolman of Bell; M.L. Whaley, auto shop of Venice; Russell Williams, motion picture man of Los Angeles; and James P. Williams, painter of Culver City.

In the courtroom and behind the scenes

 Paul Barksdale D'Orr, chief counsel for the accused.
 Chief Deputy District Attorney William C. Doran, representing Los Angeles County at the coroner's inquest.
 Raymond I. Eurney, deputy district attorney
 R.W. George, foreman of the grand jury that indicted the defendants.
 Superior Court Judge Frederick W. Houser, in charge of the criminal trial.
 Asa Keyes, deputy district attorney
 John T. Mulligan, attorney for W.B. Coburn.
 Frank D. Parent, member of the coroner's jury and later a Superior Court judge. Others on the coroner's jury were George G. Clarken, foreman; F.J. Maher, Fred U.S. Hughes, J.A. Griffith, and S.S. Lee.
 Clarence J. Reed, foreman of the trial jury.
 Inglewood Motorcycle Officer Blake B. Shambeau, a witness who said the raid was planned in a KKK meeting but who was not present at the raid itself.
 Superior Court Judge Willis, presiding over the case in the absence of Judge Houser.
 Los Angeles County District Attorney Thomas L. Woolwine
 Arthur B. Yorba, clerk of the trial court.

Chronology

Planning the raid

Police officer Shambeau told a coroner's jury that he had talked with some of Inglewood's leading citizens about the prospective raid several days before the event. Ku Klux Klan official N.A. Baker was in charge of  a planning meeting held in the Beaver funeral home on Friday, April 21, 1922, where the meeting started with prayer and then several people took an oath of fealty to the Klan, including Shambeau. It was later said that the Elduayen family were bootleggers who had sold liquor causing the death of one man and the blinding of another. A Los Angeles Examiner reporter testified at a coroner's inquest that the assemblage was told that there was to be "no tar and feathers," by order of "the big boss." Shambeau testified at the trial that the raiders "did not have enough robes to go around" for the raid on some "Mexican's place where rotten booze was made," that Baker ordered white handkerchiefs to be used on automobile radiator caps as identification and that handkerchiefs were also to be used as masks.

The raid

The next evening, Saturday, April 22, 1922, a group of 20 to 25 men from Inglewood, Huntington Park, Los Angeles, Venice, and Redondo Beach assembled at the Titan Garage in Inglewood. They included H.B. Beaver, H.A. Wait, Thomas Jennings and Dr. Ed Campbell, according to Shambeau's testimony. They went to Pine Avenue, where they helped make up a band of 50 to 200 men (the estimates varied), most of them masked, who were gathered near the home of Fidel and Angela Elduayen, their children, Bernarda, 13, and Mary, 15, and Fidel's brother, Mathias. Some entered the house, and others remained in the yard, occupied a barn or guarded the roads. Fidel Elduayen testified to the coroner’s inquest in Spanish that he and Mathias were seized, bound, and threatened with death. They heard shots fired, then they were driven first to the Inglewood jail and then to one in Redondo Beach, where their captors tried to lodge them but were refused by the officials in charge.

In a neighboring house a "Japanese" man, T. Shitara, telephoned Inglewood officials to report the event. His first call, to the "Constable of the town", was unsuccessful. Then he called the City Marshal's office, and Frank Woerner responded aboard a motorcycle that was piloted by a civilian, Clyde Vannatta. Shots were exchanged and one of the Klansmen fell mortally wounded. He was M.B. Mosher, the constable who could not be reached when Shitara called earlier.

Woerner had been driven to the Pine Avenue home from the City Hall by motorcyclist Vannatta; they were greeted by armed men, one of whom, M. B. Mosher, threatened the two with a gun, but Woerner fired first, mortally wounding Mosher and injuring his son, Walter, and another man, Leonard Ruegg.

The two Elduayen girls told reporters and later testified at trial that they were forced to change from their nightgowns with their bedroom door open as the masked men roamed their home. At the first opportunity, they and their mother fled and hid in the alfalfa fields.

Coroner's inquest

A coroner's inquest was held on Monday, April 25, in the same room in Beaver's combination furniture store and funeral home,  where, according to the testimony of participant Shambeau, the Inglewood police officer, the KKK action had been planned just four days before.

Included in the testimony was that by Grand Goblin William S. Coburn, who said he knew there were no Klansmen present at the Inglewood raid because he walked through the groups gathered in front of the Elduayen home and gave the "Grand Goblin's call" and no one answered.

Coburn testified that if KKK members or applicants for membership conducted the raid, it was "unofficial." Shambeau testified he had attended another meeting the preceding evening at which the raid was planned. In its verdict, the jury found that an "illegal masked and armed mob, presumably instigated and directed by members of the K.K.K.," caused Mosher's death; it demanded action to punish perpetrators of the crime.

Mosher was buried in Inglewood Park Cemetery on  April 26.

Investigation

On the afternoon of Tuesday, April 26, 1922, in the offices of the Ku Klux Klan in the Haas Building at 7th Street and Broadway, Los Angeles, Grand Goblin Coburn refused to hand over to Undersheriff Eugene Biscailuz and Detective Walter Hunter the roster of Ku Klux Klan members. The two officers left but returned with a search warrant and a demand to open up the safe. Coburn declined. The officers called a locksmith and were prepared to crack the safe when Coburn changed his mind and ordered it opened. Inside were money receipts and correspondence. Elsewhere in the office searchers seized two embroidered Klan robes and a file of names.

Indictment
After more than a month of hearing 133 witnesses, an 18-person grand jury on June 7 returned an indictment of two counts of false imprisonment of the Elduayen brothers, two counts of kidnapping the same men, and one count of assault with intent to commit the murder of Frank Woerner against each of the 37 defendants. All of them, except Coburn and Price, admitted taking part in the raid. There were six "John Doe" indictments returned against men whose identities might become known later. Documents seized in a raid on the offices of former Grand Goblin Coburn were also submitted. A typewriter used in the Los Angeles Klan office was presented.

During the hearings, defendant Nathan A. Baker was being held at the County Hospital after his arrest on suspicion of felony when Sheriff Traeger and Undersheriff Eugene Biscailuz  learned that he planned to escape from California and that he was bordering on a mental and nervous breakdown.

Later, on August 15, it was reported that a document had been stolen during the investigative period from the district attorney's office and found its way to the office of Paul Barksdale D'Orr and A.L. Abrahams, attorneys for most of the defendants. District Attorney Woolwine had wanted to use it as the basis for surprise testimony during the trial.

Los Angeles Examiner connection

Donald Parker, photographer for the Los Angeles Examiner, who was present during the raid, told the coroner's jury that he had been a member of the Klan for several months but resigned after April 22. R.B. (or R.D.) Knickerbocker, an Examiner reporter, was also present. Parker said he had been "tipped off," possibly by Klan kleagle N.A. Baker, and Knickerbocker said he could not escape from the klansman who was guarding him after he learned of the action that was to take place.

Leaders of the proposed raid, Knickerbocker testified at trial, proposed at the Titan Garage to give him a typewritten statement of what had occurred and then, if he and Parker "behaved right on the story," they would be offered the opportunity to take part in two more activities planned by the Klan: The first would have been a sortie by Klan members, dressed in their robes, to make an ostentatious, public cash donation to a Culver City church, and the second would have been to witness the tar-and-feathering of a prominent Venice businessman accused of "mistreating a girl."

Trial

Trial of the 37 defendants began on August 7, 1922, with Judge Houser presiding and eight men and four women in the jury box. On August 10, Nathan A. Baker, the acknowledged leader of the April 22 action, collapsed, "crumpled up with a convulsion," during the testimony of 13-year-old Bernarda Elduayen and was taken from the courtroom.  His case was later severed from the trial and never continued.

The defense referred to the events of April 22 as the "Inglewood enterprise" and sought to show that officer Frank Woerner shot Mosher without provocation and that the Elduayens were selling liquor; therefore the raid was justified. Defendant Bryson said he had been asked by Kleagle Baker to assist Constable Mosher in the raid and that he, Bryson, deputized some of the men on the way to the Pine Avenue address. He said he had bought whisky, brandy, wine, and gin from the Elduayens before the raid began. The bottles of alcohol were displayed for the jury. Hamilton testified that Charles Casto, one of the defendants, stood guard at the closed bedroom door of the two teenagers, forbidding entry to anyone.

In closing arguments, the prosecution stayed mainly with the facts of the case, and the defense used emotional appeals to sway the jury.
Prosecutor Turney "bluntly charged the raiders with being a mob of men who terrorized a mother and two little girls." Defense attorney D'Orr painted a different picture:

Constable Mosher died there defending your children and mine. He died there upholding the majesty of the law. ...  Ladies and gentlemen, any man who loved his father, whom he believed was in the lawful execution of his duty, protecting your home and mine against criminality, and who is shot down by a man who had never been assailed, and sees the fire coming toward him and does not reply to that fire and seek to stop the assailant, is unworthy of the name of an American citizen.

Verdict

After five hours of deliberation — a delay caused by the need to fill out a ballot for each charge for each defendant — the jury returned with a verdict on August 26 of not guilty on all counts. When Judge Houser adjourned court, the defendants rushed forward to shake the hand of the jurors, some of whom said they considered it a "patriotic verdict." Many defendants then entered Houser's chambers and returned with "large supplies" of the judge's campaign literature and posters.

Elduayens' arrest

Fidel Elduayen, 41, and Mathias, 31, were arrested on August 26, 1922, by federal agents who charged them with violation of the Volstead Act, which regulated the manufacture and sale of liquor in the United States. The charges were dismissed on February 2, 1924.

Split in Klan

On September 8, 1924, it was reported that more than 25 percent of the Inglewood Klan unit — named the Med Mosher Klan No. 1 — had left the national organization and formed a group called the Reformed Order of Klansmen. Spokesmen Lloyd S. Sanderson and A.H. Van de Mark accused the national body of despotism, graft and un-Americanism.

Affidavits dealing with the split were filed in Superior Court on November 7, 1924, by Ray Mears of Ocean Park and Earnest M. Schultz of Venice, both former defendants in the Elduayen trial, stating, among other claims, that G. W. Price, also a defendant, had been present on the Elduayen property and had given orders to "go home and keep our mouths shut about what happened."

On February 20, 1925, it was reported that the "Ku Klux Klan element" in Inglewood was supporting the recall of five city trustees (council members) in an attack on Street Superintendent O.O. Farmer "because of the employment in his office and field force of men who are not yet American citizens."

By 1931, an Inglewood Klan unit was known as "Loyalty Klan No. 25"; it sent a communication to the county Board of Supervisors seeking an eight-hour day and a five-day work week in public jobs, as well as the elimination of employment of wives, daughters, and sons of public officials in those positions.

See also
 History of the Ku Klux Klan in New Jersey
 Indiana Klan
 Tulsa race riot

People

 J.C. Barthel, Los Angeles City Council member questioned by a grand jury investigating the Klan

References and notes

Further reading

Books
 Bryson, L.L., The Inglewood Raiders: Story of the Celebrated Ku Klux case at Los Angeles, and Speeches to the Jury, 1923, 71 pages, ISBN none. The author was one of the men indicted and tried.

Newspapers

 "Boy Tells How Raider Was Killed," Los Angeles Times, April 24, 1922, section 1, page 1
 "King Kleagle Told Klan Head of Raid," Los Angeles Times, April 24, 1922, section 1, page 1
 "Klan Heads to Testify at Inquest," Los Angeles Times, April 25, 1922, section I, page 1
 "Plan Arrests in Mob Killing; Quick Action to Follow Inquest; Call Klan's Chief to Testify," Los Angeles Times, April 25, 1922, section I, page 1
 "Charges Klan Led Mob," Los Angeles Times, April 26, 1922, section 1, page 1
 "High Chief Disclaims Klan Guilt," Los Angeles Times, April 26, 1922, section 1, page 2
 "Klan Members Here Known," Los Angeles Times, April 26, 1922, section 1, page 1
 Otis M. Wiles, "Tense Minutes Mark Ku Klux Exposure," Los Angeles Times, April 26, 1922, section 1, page 3
 "Two Hearst Employees Among Mob," Los Angeles Times, April 26, 1922, section 1, page 1
 Otis M. Wiles, "Bury Klan Spirit With Constable; Inglewood Citizens Attend Funeral of Slain Man as Friends, Not Klansmen," Los Angeles Times, April 27, 1922, section 1, page 2
 Sentries Guard Klan Conclave; Air of Deepest Secrecy Hovers Over First Meeting Since Inglewood Raid," Los Angeles Times, section 1, pages 1 and 2
 Warden Woolard, "Masked Mob Outrages Linked With Ku Klux by Inquiry;  Kleagle's Story and Seized Papers Declared to Warrant Grand Jury Quiz and Arrests; Coburn, Price and Baker Questioned at District Attorney's Office; Seized Papers Report on Other Mob Raids; Conference of Superior Judges is Called to Consider Any Action by Grand Jury," Los Angeles Times, April 28, 1922, section 1, pages 1 and 2
 "Crush Klan, Mushet Plea; Councilman Will Introduce Resolution Asking City, State and Nation to Battle 'Menace,' Los Angeles Times, April 28, 1922, section 1, pages 1 and 2
  "Says 'There Was No Mob'; Reputed Leader of Klan Raiders Tells View; Says They Were Out to Clean Up the Bootleggers; Pick Holes in Statements of Constable and Baker," Los Angeles Times, May 1, 1922, section 1, page 2
 A.M. Rochlen, "Raiders Are Known; Officials Learn Names of Score of Masked Mob; Ku Klux Chief Defends Klan; Members to Admit Part in Raid. He Declares; Expresses Confidence They Did No Wrong; Bail Deposited for Ruegg on Assault Charge," Los Angeles Times, May 2, 1922, section I, pages 1 and 2
 A.M. Rochlen, "Action Against Klan Spreads Over State; Civil Officers Ousted; Antiklansmen Action Spreading Over State; Grand Jury Will Receive List of Inglewood Mob Members, Says Ku Klux Chief," Los Angeles Times, May 3, 1922, section 1, pages 1 and 2
 Warden Woolard, "Raid Jap Club; Arrest Score; Expect Indictments in Ku Klux Quiz; Forty-eight Mob Members Confess to Inglewood Raid; Wholesale Indictments Expected Following Grand Jury Quiz of Ku Klux Activities; Grand Jury Organized for Ku Klux Inquiry; Investigation Plans Announced in Many Other Counties of Southern California," Los Angeles Times, May 5, 1922, section 1, pages 1 and 2
 "Klan Members Are Indicted; Grand Jury at Bakersfield Goes After Three," Los Angeles Times, May 6, 1922, section 2, page 1
 "Grand Goblin to Testify; Expect Jury to Dig Deep Into Klan Secrets in Connection with Inglewood Raid," Los Angeles Times, May 8, 1922, section 2, page 1
 "Accuse Klan Raid Victims; Violation of Volstead Act Charge in Complaint Issued Against Elduayens; Face Each Other Across Grand Jury Table; Jail Asserted Cyclops," Los Angeles Times, section 2, pages 1 and 2
 "Klan Plan Is Blocked by Herron; Federal Prosecutor Denies Request for Warrants to Arrest the Elduayens; Tell of Their Parts in Inglewood Raid," Los Angeles Times, May 10, 1922, section 1, page 2
 "Roster of Klan Reveals Names of Notables; Chief of Police and Sheriff Are Included but Both Declare They Resigned Long Ago; Five Men Tell Plans of Raid; Witnesses Volunteer to Go Before Grand Jury; Inside Story of Night's Work is Bared; Pastor of Negro Church is Fearful of Bomb," Los Angeles Times, May 10, 1922, section 1, pages 1 and 2
 "Klansmen on Stand Prove Question Shy; Inquisitorial Body Fails to Get Full Facts of Inglewood Raid," Los Angeles Times, May 11, 1922, section 1, pages 1 and 2
 "Klan Destroys Guard Records; Papers Mutilated to 'Cover Up' Activities; Asserted Tamperer Forced to Resign; Ku Klux Use of Armory Obtained by Ruse," Los Angeles Times, May 13, 1922, section 2, pages 1 and 2
 "Round-Up of Ku Klux Klan Started; Hundred and  Fifty Called to Testify Before Grand Jury," Los Angeles Times, May 15, 1922, section 1, pages 1 and 2
 "Witnesses Hint Exposure Soon; Many Klan Members Ready to Confess Facts; 'Surprise' Testimony to be Given Jury Today; Texas Residents Present Woerner With Medal," Los Angeles Times, May 17, 1922, section 2, pages 1 and 2
 "Club Women's Demand Fails; Raiders' Sympathizers Seek Arrest of Elduaynes; Polite Rebuff Ends Visit to Federal Official; Burke Refuses to Hamper Woolwine Inquiry," Los Angeles Times, May 19, 1922, section 1, page 2
 "Coburn Is to Testify Upon Arrival Here," Los Angeles Times, May 20, 1922, section 1, page 1
 "Inglewood Klan Raid His Topic; Kleagle Baker Defends Society's Acts in Speech at San Bernardino," Los Angeles Times, May 22, 1922, section 1, page 2
 "Klan Witnesses to Be Recalled; Second Phase of Grand Jury Quiz Begins; Citation of Asserted Member May be Requested; Prosecutor Again Refuses to Return Seized Records ," Los Angeles Times, May 23, 1922, section 2, page 7
 "Klan's State Head Testifies; King Kleagle Tells Grand Jury About Raid, Denies Ku Klux Responsible for Mob's Action; Witness, Formerly Silent, Persuaded to Talk," Los Angeles Times, May 24, 1922, section 2, page 5
 "Ku Klux Quiz Is Nearing End;  Inquiry into Inglewood Raid Drawing to Close; Grand Jury Has Nearly All Facts It Sought; King Kleagle is Once More Denied Office Records," Los Angeles Times, May 25, 1922, section 2, page 7
 "Klan's Leaders Move to Block Prosecution; Mysterious Visitor From Imperial Palace Here to Oust All Kleagles Is Report," Los Angeles Times, May 26, 1922, section 2, page 1
 "Quiz on Klan Acts Widened; Bakersfield, Arizona Cases May Figure Here; Evidence Taken will be Laid Before Jury; Report Coburn is in Texas Unconfirmed," Los Angeles Times, June 1, 1922, section 2, page 8
 "Criswell's Application to Join Klan Forged? President of City Council Declares he Never Signed Document Found by Authorities; Baker Arrested; Is This the Signature of City Council's President? Ordered Held to Bar Flight," Los Angeles Times, June 6, 1922, section 2, pages 1 and 5
 "History of Klan Quiz" (recapitulation of the Inglewood event from the beginning), Los Angeles Times, June 8, 1922, section 1, page 5
 "Unable to Find Coburn in Atlanta; Indicted ex-Grand Goblin Cannot be Located; Price Returning for Trial," Los Angeles Times, June 8, 1922, section 1, page 1
 "Kleagle of Klan to Be Arraigned; Nathan A. Baker, Confessed Inglewood RaidLeader, Faces Court Today," Los Angeles Times, June 9, 1922, section 2, pages 1 and 2
 "Grand Goblin Coming Back;  Former Head of Local Klan to Face Charges; Announcement is Made by Atlanta Chief; Another Report Has It He Will Resist Warrant," Los Angeles Times, June 11, 1922, section 1, page 6
 A.M. Rochlen, "Oust Ku Klux Wizard, Klan to Clean House; King Kleagle Price Is Strong for Law Observance Will Stop 'Rough Stuff," Los Angeles Times, June 13, 1922, section 2, page 1
 "Prevents Split in Ku Klux; Inglewood Raiders Vote Confidence in Kleagle Nathan A. Baker," Los Angeles Times, June 14, 1922, section 2, page 1
 "Baker Splits Ku Klux Ranks; Kleagle Makes Switch in Attorneys; Action Believed Outcome of Klan Quarrel; Council Passes Anti-Disguise Ordinance," Los Angeles Times, June 15, 1922, section 2, page 1
 "Ku Klux Desert Kleagle Baker; Action of Klansmen Keeps Official in Jail; Refuse to Put Up Reduced Bail for Leader; Personal Friends Must Come to His Rescue," Los Angeles Times, June 16, 1922. section 2, pages 1 and 2
 "Report on Klan Quiz Withheld; Findings of Grand Jury Are Kept Secret; Suppressed by Court Order to Insure Fair Trial; Censure Would Prejudice Cases, Says Judge," Los Angeles Times, June 17, 1922, section 2, pages 1 and 2
 Coburn Is Indignant; Klan Chief Hits Members Here; Declares 'Traitors' Double Crossed Him and Must Answer to Him; Grand Goblin in El Paso on Way to Los Angeles to Face Charges," Los Angeles Times, June 18, 1922, section 2, pages 1 and 2
 "Coburn Is On Way Here," Los Angeles Times, June 19, 1922, section 2, page 1
 Double Klansmen's Bonds; Coburn Free on Bail; Former Grand Goblin Pleads Not Guilty; Judge's Action Surprise to Members of Hooded Order," Los Angeles Times, June 20, 1922, section 2, pages 1 and 2
 "Kleagle Baker Freed on Bail; Five Thousand Dollars in Cash is Deposited; Money Reported Ready for Increased Bonds; Released Mob Leader is Taken to His Home," Los Angeles Times, June 21, 1922, section 2, page 2
 "Klan Lawyer Begins Work; Grand Jury Transcripts of Inglewood Raid Given D'Orr," Los Angeles Times, July 6, 1922, section 2, page 3
 "Preparing Inglewood Klan Case; District Attorney's Men Make Pictures and Maps for Trial," Los Angeles Times, July 28, 1922, section 2, page 5
 "Eyes of Nation Focused on Trial of Klansmen; Supremacy of Duly Constituted Government Held at Stake; Case Begins Tomorrow" (recapitulation of case), Los Angeles Times, August 6, 1922, section 2, pages 1 and 11
 "Inglewood Trial Opens; Woolwine Plans to Aid," Los Angeles Times, August 8, 1922, section 2, pages 1, 7, and 12
 Delay in Klan Trial Unlikely; Sick Kleagle Will Not Halt Proceedings Long; Monday Fixed for Resuming if Illness is Serious; Diagnosis Indicates Baker Out for Ninety Days," Los Angeles Times, August 12, 1922, section 1, pages 1 and 10
 "State Bolsters Case Against 'Night Riders'; Witness Tells of Klan Gathering on Night Preceding Raid to Lay Plans for Attack," Los Angeles Times, August 15, 1922, section 2, pages 1 and 5
 "Grand jury Inquiry of Klan Evidence Theft; Doran Orders Quiz as Spy System is Suspected After Papers on Raid Are Stolen," Los Angeles Times, August 16, 1922, section 2, pages 1 and 5
 "Tells Plan for Venice and Culver City Raids; Inglewood Case Witness Declares Klan Was to Tar and Feather Beach City Resident," Los Angeles Times, August 17, 1922, section 2, pages 1 and 5
 "Seek Release of Klansmen; Attorneys Ask Freedom for Coburn, Price; Court Takes Motion Under Advisement; Dismiss Indictment Against Film Man," Los Angeles Times, August 19, 1922, section 2, pages 1 and 3
 "State Scores Twice in Klansmen's Trial; Court Rules Out Defense Motion for Release from Custody of Coburn and Price," Los Angeles Times, August 22, 1922, section 2, pages 1 and 9
 "Mosher Tells Story of Raid; Son of Slain Constable Put on Witness Stand; Relates How Father Fell in Rain of Bullets; Defense Seeks to Prove Klan Not Responsible," Los Angeles Times, August 23, 1922, section 2, pages 1 and 2
 "Bootlegging Trade Aired; Exposure Made in Trial of Ku Klux Klan; Witnesses Say Liquor Was Sold in Inglewood; Character of Elduayens Argued in Case," Los Angeles Times, August 24, 1922, section 2, pages 1 and 12
 "Klan Victims Under Arrest; Elduayens Charged With Dry Law Violation; Action Climaxes Acquittal of Night Riders; Brothers Found on Ranch Near Inglewood," Los Angeles Times, August 27, 1922, section 4, page 12
 "Elduayens Put Up Bonds on Liquor Charge," Los Angeles Times, August 29, 1922, section 2, page 1
 "Inglewood Klan Tragedy Figure Is Sued by Wife," Los Angeles Times, July 3, 1923, section 2, page 2
 "Cause of Noted Klan Attack in Federal Court,: Los Angeles Times, February 3, 1924, section F, page 15
 "New Rebellion in Klan; More Than 25 Per Cent of Inglewood Body Revolt and Reorganize; Flay Invisible Empire," Los Angeles Times, September 8, 1924, page A-1
 "Crimes Are Charged to Leader of Klan Here; Intimidation and Blackmail Plot Laid to Price; Sweeping Denial Made as Case Is Continued," Los Angeles Times, November 18, 1924, page A-1
  "Elduayen Case Is Dismissed," Los Angeles Times, December 12, 1924, page 6

1922 murders in the United States
Inglewood, California
Ku Klux Klan in California
Ku Klux Klan crimes
Prohibition in the United States
History of Los Angeles County, California
History of racism in California